Douglas Howard Grindstaff (April 6, 1931 – July 23, 2018) was an American sound editor. He won five Primetime Emmy Awards and was nominated for nine more in the category Outstanding Sound Editing for his work on the television programs Star Trek: The Original Series, The Immortal, Mannix, Mission: Impossible, Medical Story, The Quest, The Fantastic Journey, Police Story, Fantasy Island, Max Headroom and also the television films The Last Hurrah, To Kill a Cop, A Fire in the Sky and Power. Grindstaff died in July 2018 in Peoria, Arizona, at the age of 87.

References

External links 

1931 births
2018 deaths
People from Los Angeles
American sound editors
Primetime Emmy Award winners